James Thomas Jr. (August 17, 1947 – June 6, 2017) was a professional American football running back in the National Football League. He played five seasons for the San Francisco 49ers.  His brothers Earl Thomas and Mike Thomas also played in the National Football League.

References

1947 births
2017 deaths
People from Greenville, Texas
Players of American football from Texas
American football running backs
Texas–Arlington Mavericks football players
San Francisco 49ers players